Owen Porter Churchill (March 8, 1896 – November 22, 1985) was an American sailor who competed in the 1932 Summer Olympics.

In 1932 he was a crew member of the American boat Angelita which won the gold medal in the 8 metre class.

Swim fin
In 1940 Churchill designed and patented the swim fin improving it from the earlier version made by Louis de Corlieu in 1935. With skin-diving's low popularity in America, he sold under a thousand pairs. He thought of the idea from seeing Tahitian boys using the same concept. They would use soft rubber and metal bands shaped like a fish tail.  Churchill improved the shape and used vulcanized rubber.

The income from his then-patented and now-commonplace device let him pursue his passion of competitive sailing.

Churchill became the primary patron and team captain of the United States Olympic Yachting team at both the 1932 (Los Angeles) and 1936 (Berlin) Olympic Games. Churchill was also a lifetime member of Los Angeles Yacht Club, where memorabilia of his exploits has been on display. During the 1984 Olympic Games in Los Angeles, special recognition was given to Churchill by Peter Ueberroth for his lifelong efforts to promote sailing. Churchill's Star Fleet yacht, The Angelita, was fully restored for the occasion and re-christened at the time in Los Angeles harbor.

References

External links
 
 
 
 
 

1896 births
1985 deaths
American male sailors (sport)
Olympic gold medalists for the United States in sailing
Sailors at the 1928 Summer Olympics – 8 Metre
Sailors at the 1932 Summer Olympics – 8 Metre
Sailors at the 1936 Summer Olympics – 8 Metre
Medalists at the 1932 Summer Olympics
Los Angeles Yacht Club sailors